The Rooney Prize for Irish Literature was created in 1976 by the Irish American businessman Dan Rooney, owner and chairman of the NFL Pittsburgh Steelers franchise and former US Ambassador to Ireland. The prize is awarded to Irish writers aged under 40 who are published in Irish or English. Although often associated with individual books, it is intended to reward a body of work. Originally worth £750, the current value of the prize is €10,000.

List of recipients

 1976: Heno Magee
 1977: Desmond Hogan
 1978: Peter Sheridan
 1979: Kate Cruise O'Brien, A Gift Horse (short stories)
 1980: Bernard Farrell
 1981: Neil Jordan
 1982: Medbh McGuckian; Special prize awarded to Seán Ó Tuama and Thomas Kinsella for An Duanaire / Poems of the Dispossessed
 1983: Dorothy Nelson, In Night's City (novel)
 1984: Ronan Sheehan
 1985: Frank McGuinness, Observe the Sons of Ulster Marching Towards the Somme (play)
 1986: Paul Mercier
 1987: Deirdre Madden, Hidden Symptoms (novel)
 1988: Glenn Patterson, Burning Your Own (novel)
 1989: Robert McLiam Wilson, Ripley Bogle (novel)
 1990: Mary Dorcey, A Noise from the Woodshed (short stories)
 1991: Anne Enright, The Portable Virgin (short stories)
 1992: Hugo Hamilton
 1993: Gerard Fanning (poet)
 1994: Colum McCann, Fishing the Sloe-Black River (short stories)
 1995: Philip MacCann, The Miracle Shed (short stories)
 1996: Mike McCormack, Getting It in the Head (short stories); additional Special Award presented to Vona Groarke and Conor O'Callaghan
 1997: Anne Haverty, One Day as a Tiger (novel)
 1998: David Wheatley, Thirst (poems)
 1999: Mark O'Rowe, Howie the Rookie (play)
 2000: Claire Keegan, Antarctica (short stories), Special award presented to David Marcus.
 2001: Keith Ridgway, Standard Time (short stories)
 2002: Caitríona O’Reilly, The Nowhere Birds (poems)
 2003: Eugene O'Brien, Eden (play)
 2004: Claire Kilroy, All Summer (novel)
 2005: Nick Laird, To a Fault (poems)
 2006: Philip Ó Ceallaigh, Notes from a Turkish Whorehouse (short stories)
 2007: Kevin Barry, There Are Little Kingdoms (short stories)  
 2008: Leontia Flynn, Drives (poems)
 2009: Kevin Power, Bad Day in Blackrock
 2010: Leanne O'Sullivan, Cailleach: The Hag Of Beara
 2011: Lucy Caldwell
 2012: Nancy Harris
 2013: Ciarán Collins
 2014: Colin Barrett
 2015: Sara Baume
 2016: Doireann Ní Ghríofa
 2017: Elizabeth Reapy
 2018: Caitriona Lally
 2019: Mark O'Connell
2020: Stephen Sexton, If All the World and Love Were Young
2021: Niamh Campbell, This Happy
2022: Seán Hewitt

References and footnotes

Awards established in 1976
Irish literary awards
Literary awards honouring young writers
Political book awards
1976 establishments in Ireland